The Nigerien Democratic Movement for an African Federation (MODEN/FA-Lumana) is a political party in Niger, led by Hama Amadou.

History
The party was established on 12 May 2009. It did not run in the 2009 parliamentary elections, but contested the 2011 general elections, putting forward Amadou as its presidential candidate; he finished third with 20% of the vote. In the parliamentary elections it won 23 of the 113 seats in the National Assembly.

Amadou ran for the presidency again in the 2016 general elections. He finished second in the first round of voting, receiving 18% of the vote, qualifying for the second round. However, the party boycotted the second round, resulting in Mahamadou Issoufou winning with 92% of the vote. The elections also saw the party win 25 seats in the National Assembly, which was expanded to 171 seats.

Singer Hamsou Garba is a notable supporter of the party, which led to her imprisonment, briefly, in Niamey in 2016.

Electoral results

President of Niger

National Assembly

References

External links
Official website

Political parties in Niger
2009 establishments in Niger
Political parties established in 2009